This is an incomplete list of lakes in Ontario, a province of Canada. There are over 250,000 lakes in Ontario, constituting around 20% of the world's fresh water supply.

Larger lake statistics

#
24 Mile Lake

A

B

C

D

E

F

G
Gananoque Lake
Garson Lake
Gathering Lake
Gibson Lake (disambiguation), multiple lakes
Gibson Lake (Greater Sudbury)
Gillies Lake
Gloucester Pool
Go Home Lake
Golden Lake
Gordon Lake
Ghost Lake
Gould Lake (disambiguation), several lakes
Green Lake
Grundy Lake
Guelph Lake
Gull Lake (Ontario)
Gullrock Lake
Gunter Lake

H
Halls Lake (Haliburton County)
Hammer Lake
Head Lake (Kawartha Lakes)
Head Lake (Haliburton County)
Heart Lake
Herbert Lake
Holden Lake
Lake Huron
Horseshoe Lakemultiple lakes

I
Inn Lake
Indian Lake
Innis Lake
Irwin Lake
Ivanhoe Lake

J
Jack Lake
Jeff Lake
Lake Joseph
Jules Lake
Jumping Cariboo Lake

K
Kabinakagami Lake
Lake Kagawong
Kahshe Lake
Kamaniskeg Lake
Kashagawigamog Lake
Kashwakamak Lake
Kasshabog Lake
Kawagama Lake
Kawartha Lakes
Lake Kelso
Kennisis Lake
Kesagami Lake
Kimber Lake
Kushog Lake
Lake Kairiskons
Lake Kishkatina

L
Lake Bernard (Parry Sound District)
Lac des Mille Lacs
Lady Evelyn Lake
Lake Madawaska
Lake of Bays (Kenora District)
Lake of Bays (Muskoka lake)
Lake of the Woods
Lake of Two Islands
Larder Lake
Little Branch Lake
Little Lake (Peterborough)
Little Moose Lake
Little Papineau Lake
Little Sachigo Lake
Little Sucker Lake
Little Yirkie Lake
Limerick Lake
Long Lake
Loughborough Lake
Lower Beverley Lake
Lower Buckhorn Lake

M

Mabel Lake
MacDowell Lake
Madawaska Lake
Mameigwess Lake (north Kenora District)
Mameigwess Lake (south Kenora District)
Lake Manitou
Lake Manitouwabing
Maple Lake
Marmion Lake
Mary Lake
Lake Matinenda
Maul Lake
Maynard Lake
Mazinaw Lake
McArthur Lake
McKay Lake (Ottawa)
McKay Lake (Pic River) 
McLaren Lake
Mirror Lake
Mississauga Lake
Mississippi Lake
Lake Mindemoya
Minnitaki Lake
Missisa Lake
Mojikit Lake
Mong Lake
Morrison Lake
Mountain Lake
Mozhabong Lake
Mud Lake
Muldrew Lake
Lake Muskoka
Muskrat Lake

N
Nameless Lake (Sudbury District)
Net Lake
Nettleton Lake
Nicholls Lake
Night Hawk Lake
Lake Nipigon
Lake Nipissing
North Caribou Lake
Lake Nosbonsing
Nungesser Lake
Nishin Lake

O
Oak Lake
Oba Lake - North
Oba Lake - South
Octopus Lake
Lake Ogoki
Old Man's Lake
Onaman Lake
Onigam Lake
Onion Lake
Lake Ontario
Opeongo Lake
Opinicon Lake
Otter Tail Lake
Ottertooth Lake
Otty Lake
Ozhiski Lake

P
Packsack Lake
Lake Panache
Paint Lake
Pakeshkag Lake
Papineau Lake
Paudash Lake
Peninsula Lake
Perch Lake
Pelican Lake
Percy Lake
Peters Lake (Sudbury District)
Pierce Lake
Pierre Lake
Pike Lake
Pigeon Lake
Pog Lake
Pokei Lake
Pot Lake
Priamo Lake
Professor's Lake
Pumphouse Lake
Puslinch Lake
Pine Lake

R
Rainbow Lake
Rainy Lake
Lake Ramsey
Rebecca Lake, multiple lakes
Redbridge Lake
Red Cedar Lake
Red Squirrel Lake
Redstone Lake (Haliburton County)
Redstone Lake (Sudbury District)
Restoule Lake
Rice Lake
Ril Lake
Riley Lake (Kenora District)
Riley Lake (Muskoka)
Rock Lake (Algonquin Park)
Rock Lake (Kenora District)
Lake Rosalind
Lake Rosseau
Round Lake
Ruth Lake
Red lake

S
Saskatchewan Lake
Sachigo Lake
Saint Francis (Lac Saint-François)
Salerno Lake
Salmon Lake
Sand Lake, numerous lakes by this name
Sand Pits Lake
Sandy Lake (Algoma District)
Sandy Lake
Savant Lake
Sawyer lake
Lake Scugog
Seseganaga Lake
Lac Seul
Severn Lake
Seymour Lake (disambiguation), several lakes by this name
Sharbot Lake
Shibogama Lake
Shoal Lake
Shutze Lake
Lake Simcoe
Six Mile Lake
Skeleton Lake
Skootamatta Lake
Smoothrock Lake
Soap Lake
South Summit Lake
Sparrow Lake
Spotter Lake
Spring Lake
Steel Lake
Steve Lake
Stoco Lake
Lake St. Clair
St. Joe Lake
Lake St. Joseph
Lake St. Peter
Stony Lake
Sturgeon Lake
Sunfish Lake
Lake Superior
Sydenham Lake
Syrette Lake

T
Talon Lake
Tangamong Lake
Lake Temagami
Tetapaga Lake
Tetu Lake
The Third Lake
Thirty Island Lake
Lake Timiskaming
Triangle Lake (Ontario)
Trout Lake (Algoma District)
Trout Lake (Nipissing District)
Tunnel Lake
Turtle Lake
Twelve Mile Lake (Ontario)
Twin Narrows Lake
Twoline Lake

U
Ulster Lake (Kenora District)
Upper Algocen Lake
Upper Beverley Lake
Upper Nishin Lake
Upper Redwater Lake
Upper Rideau Lake
Umfreville Lake

W
Wabatongushi Lake
Wabigoon Lake
Wahwashkesh Lake
Wanapitei Lake
Wapikopa Lake
Wawa Lake
Weagamow Lake
West Shining Tree Lake
Whiddon Lake
White Lake
Whiteclay Lake
White Otter Lake
Whitewater Lake
Widdifield Lake
Windermere Lake
Wintering Lake
Windigo Lake
Windy Lake
Winisk Lake
Wolfe Lake
Lake Wolsey
Wood Lake
Wunnummin Lake

Y
Yorkend Lake

Z
 Zionz Lake

References

External links

 Geographical names, Canada

Lakes
Ontario